Philmore Gordon "Boots" Davidson (1928 in Port-of-Spain, Trinidad – 1993) was an arranger and musician of the steelpan.

Person
Philmore Davidson was one of the leader figures of the Casablanca Steel Orchestra, one of the oldest steel bands of Trinidad. He was a member of the Trinidad All Steel Percussion Orchestra (TASPO) and visited England in 1951. In 1956, Davidson left Trinidad to live in London.

Davidson is buried in Kensal Green Cemetery.

References

Steelpan musicians
Trinidad and Tobago musicians
1928 births
1993 deaths
Burials at Kensal Green Cemetery
Trinidad and Tobago emigrants to the United Kingdom
Black British musicians